Efavirenz (EFV), sold under the brand names Sustiva among others, is an antiretroviral medication used to treat and prevent HIV/AIDS. It is generally recommended for use with other antiretrovirals. It may be used for prevention after a needlestick injury or other potential exposure. It is sold both by itself and in combination as efavirenz/emtricitabine/tenofovir. It is taken by mouth.

Common side effects include rash, nausea, headache, feeling tired, and trouble sleeping. Some of the rashes may be serious such as Stevens–Johnson syndrome. Other serious side effects include depression, thoughts of suicide, liver problems, and seizures. It is not safe for use during pregnancy. It is a non-nucleoside reverse transcriptase inhibitor (NNRTI) and works by blocking the function of reverse transcriptase.

Efavirenz was approved for medical use in the United States in 1998, and in the European Union in 1999. It is on the World Health Organization's List of Essential Medicines. As of 2016, it is available as a generic medication.

Medical uses 
For HIV infection that has not previously been treated, the United States Department of Health and Human Services Panel on Antiretroviral Guidelines recommends the use of efavirenz in combination with tenofovir/emtricitabine (Truvada) as one of the preferred NNRTI-based regimens in adults and adolescents and children.

Efavirenz is also used in combination with other antiretroviral agents as part of an expanded post-exposure prophylaxis regimen to reduce the risk of HIV infection in people exposed to a significant risk (e.g. needlestick injuries, certain types of unprotected sex, etc.).

Pregnancy and breastfeeding 
Efavirenz is safe to use during the first trimester of pregnancy.  Efavirenz passes into breast milk and breast-fed infants may be exposed to efavirenz.

Contraindications 
People who have taken this medication before and experienced an allergic reaction should avoid taking further efavirenz dosages. Hypersensitivity reactions include Stevens–Johnson syndrome, toxic skin eruptions, and erythema multiforme.

Adverse effects 
Neuropsychiatric effects are the most common adverse effects, and include disturbed sleep (including nightmares, insomnia, disrupted sleep, and daytime fatigue), dizziness, headaches, vertigo, blurred vision, anxiety, and cognitive impairment (including fatigue, confusion, and memory and concentration problems), and depression, including suicidal thinking.  Some people experience euphoria.

Rash and nausea may occur.

Use of efavirenz can produce a false positive result in some urine tests for marijuana.

Efavirenz may lengthen the QT interval so should not be used in people with or at risk of torsades de pointes.

Efavirenz may cause convulsions in adult and pediatric populations who have a history of seizures.

Drug interactions 
Efavirenz is broken down in the liver by enzymes that belong to the cytochrome P450 system, which include both CYP2B6 and CYP3A4. Efavirenz is a substrate of these enzymes and can decrease the metabolism of other drugs that require the same enzymes. However, efavirenz also induces these enzymes, which means the enzyme activity is enhanced and the metabolism of other drugs broken down by CYP2B6 and CYP3A4 can be increased. People who are taking both efavirenz and other drugs metabolized by the same enzymes might need the dose of their drugs to be increased or decreased.

One group of drugs that efavirenz affects is protease inhibitors, which are used for HIV/AIDS. Efavirenz will lower the blood levels of most protease inhibitors, including amprenavir, atazanavir, and indinavir. At lowered levels, protease inhibitors may not be effective in people taking both drugs, which means the virus that causes HIV/AIDS won't be stopped from replicating and may become resistant to the protease inhibitor.

Efavirenz also affects antifungal drugs, which are used for fungal infections such as urinary tract infections. Similar to the effect seen with protease inhibitors, efavirenz lowers the blood levels of antifungal drugs like voriconazole, itraconazole, ketoconazole, and posaconazole. As a result of lowered levels, antifungal drugs may not be effective in people taking both drugs, which means that the fungi that cause the infection may become resistant to the antifungal.

Mechanism of action

Anti-HIV effects 
Efavirenz falls in the NNRTI class of antiretrovirals. Both nucleoside and non-nucleoside RTIs inhibit the same target, the reverse transcriptase enzyme, an essential viral enzyme which transcribes viral RNA into DNA. Unlike nucleoside RTIs, which bind at the enzyme's active site, NNRTIs act allosterically by binding to a distinct site away from the active site known as the NNRTI pocket.

Efavirenz is not effective against HIV-2, as the pocket of the HIV-2 reverse transcriptase has a different structure, which confers intrinsic resistance to the NNRTI class.

As most NNRTIs bind within the same pocket, viral strains which are resistant to efavirenz are usually also resistant to the other NNRTIs, nevirapine and delavirdine. The most common mutation observed after efavirenz treatment is K103N, which is also observed with other NNRTIs. Nucleoside reverse-transcriptase inhibitors (NRTIs) and efavirenz have different binding targets, so cross-resistance is unlikely; the same is true with regard to efavirenz and protease inhibitors.

Neuropsychiatric effects 
As of 2016 the mechanism of efavirenz' neuropsychiatric adverse effects was not clear.  Efavirenz appears to have neurotoxicity, possibly by interfering with mitochondrial function, which may in turn possibly be caused by inhibiting creatine kinase but also possibly by disrupting mitochondrial membranes or by interfering with nitric oxide signalling.  Some neuropsychiatric adverse effects may be mediated through cannabinoid receptors, or through activity at the 5-HT2A receptor, but efavirenz interacts with many CNS receptors, so this is not clear.  The neuropsychiatric adverse effects are dose-dependent.

Chemical properties 
Efavirenz is chemically described as (4S)-6-chloro-4-(2-cyclopropylethynyl)-4-(trifluoromethyl)-1H-3,1-benzoxazin-2-one. Its empirical formula is C14H9ClF3NO2. Efavirenz is a white to slightly pink crystalline powder with a molecular mass of 315.68 g/mol. It is practically insoluble in water (<10 µg/mL).

History 
Efavirenz was approved by the FDA on 21 September 1998.

On 17 February 2016, the FDA approved the generic tablet formulation to be produced by Mylan.

In late 2018, Thailand's Government Pharmaceutical Organization (GPO) announced that it will produce efavirenz after receiving WHO approval.
Efavirenz code name is DMP 266, discovered by Du pont Pharma. European countries are set to receive the license for manufacturing of Efavirenz in May 1999.

Society and culture

Pricing information 
A one-month supply of 600 mg tablets costs approximately US$1,010 in July 2016. In 2007, Merck provided Efavirenz in certain developing countries and countries largely affected by HIV for about US$0.65 per day. Some emerging countries have opted to purchase Indian generics.

In Thailand, a one-month supply of efavirenz + Truvada, as of June 2012, cost 2,900 baht, and there is a social program for patients who cannot afford the medication.  Thailand will produce efavirenz domestically. Its Government Pharmaceutical Organization product costs 180 baht per bottle of thirty 600 mg tablets. The imported version in Thailand retails for more than 1,000 baht per bottle. GPO will devote 2.5 percent of its manufacturing capacity to make 42 million efavirenz pills in 2018, allowing it to serve export markets as well as domestic. The Philippines alone will order about 300,000 bottles of efavirenz for 51 million baht.

In South Africa, a license has been granted to generics giant Aspen Pharmacare to manufacture, and distribute to sub-Saharan Africa, a cost-effective antiretroviral drug.

Recreational use 
Abuse of efavirenz by crushing and smoking the tablets for supposed hallucinogenic and dissociative effects has been reported in South Africa, where it is used in a mixture known as whoonga and nyaope.

Brands
As of 2016, efavirenz is marketed in various jurisdictions under the brand names Adiva, Avifanz, Efamat, Efatec, Efavir, Efavirenz, Efcure, Eferven, Efrin, Erige, Estiva, Evirenz, Filginase, Stocrin, Sulfina V, Sustiva, Virorrever, and Zuletel.

As of 2016, the combination of efavirenz, tenofovir, and emtricitabine is marketed in various jurisdictions under the brand names Atripla, Atroiza, Citenvir, Oditec, Teevir, Trustiva, Viraday, and Vonavir.

As of 2016, the combination of efavirenz, tenofovir, and lamivudine is marketed under the brand name Eflaten.

References

External links 
 

5-HT2A agonists
Alkyne derivatives
Benzoxazines
Bristol Myers Squibb
Carbamates
Cyclopropyl compounds
CYP3A4 inducers
Estrogens
GABAA receptor positive allosteric modulators
Hepatotoxins
Serotonin–dopamine reuptake inhibitors
Non-nucleoside reverse transcriptase inhibitors
Chloroarenes
Trifluoromethyl compounds
Psychedelic drugs
VMAT inhibitors
World Health Organization essential medicines
Wikipedia medicine articles ready to translate